The following species in the flowering plant genus Thymus, the thymes, are accepted by Plants of the World Online. Thymus is considered a welldefined genus within its family as its species have consistent chemical and morphological characters.

Species

Thymus adamovicii 
Thymus × aitanae 
Thymus alatauensis 
Thymus albicans 
Thymus × alcarazii 
Thymus alfredae 
Thymus algeriensis 
Thymus × almeriensis 
Thymus × almijarensis 
Thymus alpestris 
Thymus altaicus 
Thymus alternans 
Thymus amurensis 
Thymus antoninae 
Thymus × aragonensis 
Thymus × arcanus 
Thymus × arcuatus 
Thymus × arenarius 
Thymus argaeus 
Thymus × armuniae 
Thymus arsenijevii 
Thymus artvinicus 
Thymus × arundanus 
Thymus × athous 
Thymus atlanticus 
Thymus atticus 
Thymus aznavourii 
Thymus baeticus 
Thymus baicalensis 
Thymus bashkiriensis 
Thymus × beltraniae 
Thymus × benitorum 
Thymus × bermius 
Thymus bihoriensis 
Thymus bivalens 
Thymus bleicherianus 
Thymus boissieri 
Thymus bornmuelleri 
Thymus borysthenicus 
Thymus × borzygis 
Thymus bovei 
Thymus × brachychaetus 
Thymus brachychilus 
Thymus bracteatus 
Thymus bracteosus 
Thymus × bractichina 
Thymus × braunii 
Thymus brevipetiolatus 
Thymus broussonetii 
Thymus bulgaricus 
Thymus × bulsanensis 
Thymus caespititius 
Thymus calcareus 
Thymus callieri 
Thymus camphoratus 
Thymus canoviridis 
Thymus capitellatus 
Thymus cappadocicus 
Thymus cariensis 
Thymus carmanicus 
Thymus carnosus 
Thymus × carrionii 
Thymus catharinae 
Thymus × celtibericus 
Thymus chamarensis 
Thymus cherlerioides 
Thymus cilicicus 
Thymus × cimicinus 
Thymus × citriodorus 
Thymus collinus 
Thymus comosus 
Thymus comptus 
Thymus convolutus 
Thymus coriifolius 
Thymus crebrifolius 
Thymus × cremnophilus 
Thymus crenulatus 
Thymus curtus 
Thymus × czorsztynensis 
Thymus dacicus 
Thymus daenensis 
Thymus daghestanicus 
Thymus dahuricus 
Thymus decussatus 
Thymus degenii 
Thymus desjatovae 
Thymus × diazii 
Thymus didukhii 
Thymus diminutus 
Thymus × dimorphus 
Thymus disjunctus 
Thymus dmitrievae 
Thymus doerfleri 
Thymus dolomiticus 
Thymus dolopicus 
Thymus dreatensis 
Thymus dubjanskyi 
Thymus dzalindensis 
Thymus dzevanovskyi 
Thymus eigii 
Thymus ekimii 
Thymus elegans 
Thymus elenevskyi 
Thymus × eliasii 
Thymus elisabethae 
Thymus embergeri 
Thymus × enicensis 
Thymus eravinensis 
Thymus eremita 
Thymus eriocalyx 
Thymus evenkiensis 
Thymus extremus 
Thymus fallax 
Thymus × faustinoi 
Thymus fedtschenkoi 
Thymus flabellatus 
Thymus fontqueri 
Thymus funkii 
Thymus × genesianus 
Thymus × georgicus 
Thymus glabricaulis 
Thymus gobi-altaicus 
Thymus gobicus 
Thymus granatensis 
Thymus groenlandicus 
Thymus guberlinensis 
Thymus × guerrae 
Thymus guyonii 
Thymus hartvigii 
Thymus haussknechtii 
Thymus helendzhicus 
Thymus × henriquesii 
Thymus × henryi 
Thymus herba-barona 
Thymus × hieronymi 
Thymus hohenackeri 
Thymus holosericeus 
Thymus × hybridus 
Thymus hyemalis 
Thymus × ibericus 
Thymus iljinii 
Thymus inaequalis 
Thymus incertus 
Thymus × indalicus 
Thymus indigirkensis 
Thymus integer 
Thymus jalasianus 
Thymus jankae 
Thymus japonicus 
Thymus jenisseensis 
Thymus × jimenezii 
Thymus × josephi-angeli 
Thymus jurtzevii 
Thymus kamelinii 
Thymus karamarianicus 
Thymus karatavicus 
Thymus karavaevii 
Thymus karjaginii 
Thymus kimishepensis 
Thymus kirgisorum 
Thymus koeieanus 
Thymus komarovii 
Thymus kondratjukii 
Thymus × korneckii 
Thymus kosteleckyanus 
Thymus kotschyanus 
Thymus krylovii 
Thymus lacaitae 
Thymus laconicus 
Thymus ladjanuricus 
Thymus × lainzii 
Thymus lanceolatus 
Thymus lavrenkoanus 
Thymus lenensis 
Thymus leptophyllus 
Thymus leucospermus 
Thymus leucostomus 
Thymus leucotrichus 
Thymus levitskyi 
Thymus linearis 
Thymus × littoralis 
Thymus longedentatus 
Thymus longicaulis 
Thymus longiflorus 
Thymus loscosii 
Thymus lotocephalus 
Thymus magnificus 
Thymus majkopiensis 
Thymus mandschuricus 
Thymus marandensis 
Thymus markhotensis 
Thymus maroccanus 
Thymus × martinezii 
Thymus mastichina 
Thymus × mastichinalis 
Thymus mastigophorus 
Thymus membranaceus 
Thymus × mercadalii 
Thymus michaelis 
Thymus migricus 
Thymus minussinensis 
Thymus × mixtus 
Thymus moldavicus 
Thymus mongolicus 
Thymus × monrealensis 
Thymus × monteilii 
Thymus × moralesii 
Thymus moroderi 
Thymus × mourae 
Thymus mugodzharicus 
Thymus munbyanus 
Thymus musilii 
Thymus nakhodkensis 
Thymus narymensis 
Thymus nerczensis 
Thymus nervosus 
Thymus nervulosus 
Thymus neurophyllus 
Thymus nitens 
Thymus × novocastellanus 
Thymus novograblenovii 
Thymus numidicus 
Thymus nummularius 
Thymus × nuriensis 
Thymus × oblongifolius 
Thymus ochotensis 
Thymus odoratissimus 
Thymus oehmianus 
Thymus oenipontanus 
Thymus origanoides 
Thymus oriolanus 
Thymus orospedanus 
Thymus osseticus 
Thymus pallasianus 
Thymus pallescens 
Thymus pallidus 
Thymus pannonicus 
Thymus × paradoxus 
Thymus parnassicus 
Thymus paronychioides 
Thymus pastoralis 
Thymus × pastoris 
Thymus pavlovii 
Thymus pectinatus 
Thymus perinicus 
Thymus persicus 
Thymus petraeus 
Thymus phyllopodus 
Thymus picentinus 
Thymus piperella 
Thymus plasonii 
Thymus × porcii 
Thymus praecox 
Thymus probatovae 
Thymus proximus 
Thymus × pseudoalpestris 
Thymus pseudocollinus 
Thymus × pseudogranatensis 
Thymus × pseudograniticus 
Thymus pseudohirsutus 
Thymus × pseudostepposus 
Thymus × pseudothracicus 
Thymus pubescens 
Thymus pulchellus 
Thymus pulcherrimus 
Thymus pulegioides 
Thymus pulvinatus 
Thymus punctulosus 
Thymus purpureoviolaceus 
Thymus putoranicus 
Thymus quinquecostatus 
Thymus × radoi 
Thymus × ramonianus 
Thymus rasitatus 
Thymus reverdattoanus 
Thymus revolutus 
Thymus riatarum 
Thymus richardii 
Thymus × riojanus 
Thymus roegneri 
Thymus roseus 
Thymus × royoi 
Thymus × rubioi 
Thymus × ruiz-latorrei 
Thymus sachalinensis 
Thymus samius 
Thymus saturejoides 
Thymus schimperi 
Thymus schischkinii 
Thymus × schistosus 
Thymus schlothauerae 
Thymus × schmidtii 
Thymus × segurae 
Thymus semiglaber 
Thymus × sennenii 
Thymus seravschanicus 
Thymus sergievskajae 
Thymus serpylloides 
Thymus serpyllum 
Thymus serrulatus 
Thymus sessilifolius 
Thymus × severianoi 
Thymus sibiricus 
Thymus sibthorpii 
Thymus sipyleus 
Thymus skopjensis 
Thymus sokolovii 
Thymus spathulifolius 
Thymus spinulosus 
Thymus spryginii 
Thymus stojanovii 
Thymus striatus 
Thymus subcollinus 
Thymus × subhirsutus 
Thymus × subramosus 
Thymus substriatus 
Thymus syriacus 
Thymus talijevii 
Thymus tauricus 
Thymus ternejicus 
Thymus terskeicus 
Thymus teucrioides 
Thymus thracicus 
Thymus tiflisiensis 
Thymus × toletanus 
Thymus transcaspicus 
Thymus transcaucasicus 
Thymus trautvetteri 
Thymus × tschernjaievii 
Thymus turczaninovii 
Thymus turkmenii 
Thymus × tzvelevii 
Thymus urumovii 
Thymus urussovii 
Thymus ussuriensis 
Thymus × valdesii 
Thymus vavilovii 
Thymus verchojanicus 
Thymus × viciosoi 
Thymus villosus 
Thymus × vitekii 
Thymus vulgaris 
Thymus × welwitschii 
Thymus willdenowii 
Thymus willkommii 
Thymus × xilocae 
Thymus × zedelmejeri 
Thymus zygioides 
Thymus zygis 
Thymus × zygophorus

References

Thymus